The Music Hall at Fair Park (originally the Fair Park Auditorium or State Fair Auditorium) is a performing arts theater in Dallas, Texas's Fair Park that opened in 1925.

The building is of Spanish Baroque style with Moorish architectural influences, containing six stair towers capped with cast domes and arcade porches overlooking Fair Park. Air conditioning was added in 1954, and in 1972 the Hall was remodeled again with an expanded lobby and restaurant. In 1999 the theater was refurbished and updated. Because of the spacious nature of the Music Hall, the facility is a nationally recognized venue for Broadway musical touring companies and other large-scale public and private functions. The Music Hall is currently home to the Dallas Summer Musicals and was home to the Dallas Opera from 1957 to 2009.

See also

National Register of Historic Places listings in Dallas County, Texas
List of Dallas Landmarks

References

External links

Wicked performing at Music Hall at Fair Park

1925 establishments in Texas
Buildings and structures in Dallas
Concert halls in Dallas
Fair Park
Landmarks in Dallas
Music venues completed in 1925
Music venues in Dallas
Performing arts centers in Texas
Theatre in Dallas